Yazdani Bakery is an Irani cafe or Persian style bakery in Mumbai, India.

History
The bakery was opened in 1953 by Late Zend Meherwan Zend, an Irani baker.

The bakery
All products in the bakery are handmade, and baked in diesel ovens. The bakery draws a lot of visitors, particularly international visitors especially Germans. The building, built in the early 20th century, was originally a Japanese bank, which was later sold off.

Honour
On 11 December 2007, the bakery was felicitated by Maharashtra governor SM Krishna the Urban Heritage & Citizens Award.

See also
 List of bakeries

References

Yazdani: Bread and butter for three generations of Mumbai Iranis, Shaheen Peerbhai, 11 January, 2011, CNN Travel
Yazdani Bakery: A place with a soul in the megalopolis | Business Line
https://web.archive.org/web/20071005151830/http://www.uppercrustindia.com/21crust/twentyone/people3.htm

External links

Buildings and structures in Mumbai
Bakeries of India
Food and drink companies based in Mumbai
Articles containing video clips